The Coen Tunnel is a railway tunnel in Mingo Junction, Ohio, United States. It is part of the Wheeling and Lake Erie Railway's ex-Pittsburgh and West Virginia Railway line.

References

Transportation in Jefferson County, Ohio
Railroad tunnels in Ohio
Pittsburgh and West Virginia Railway
Buildings and structures in Jefferson County, Ohio